Shelly West (born May 23, 1958) is an American country music singer. Her mother was the country music star Dottie West, whose career spanned three decades. The younger West reached her peak in popularity during the 1980s before mostly retiring in the wake of her mother's death.

Biography

1981–1987
West was born in Cleveland, Ohio, United States, where her mother, country star/songwriter Dottie West began appearing on the television program Landmark Jamboree as one half of a country-pop vocal duo called the Kay-Dots alongside partner Kathy Dee as Dottie was reinventing herself as a country pop star, and as she grew up in the country music genre, Shelly's style was not significantly different from that of her mother's. West is best known for her hit duets with David Frizzell, especially their number-one hit "You're the Reason God Made Oklahoma". She also was a successful solo artist, having her own number-one hit, "José Cuervo" in 1983. West was married to Allen Frizzell between 1981 and 1985.

1987–1992: Retirement
West did reunite with Frizzell for a few shows in the late 1980s. West married Garry Hood in 1986 and had twin sons. In 1990, Shelly toured with her mother, Dottie; together, they were popular on the road. On August 30, 1991, Dottie was involved in a major car accident, eventually dying five days later, on September 4, from injuries sustained in the accident. West was a technical adviser for a television biopic about her mother's life, Big Dreams and Broken Hearts: The Dottie West Story, produced by and starring actress Michele Lee. At that point, amid major changes in the country music industry that impacted the careers of many established country stars, the younger West retired to focus on her family.

Post-retirement
In June 2005, CMT honored Shelly and her duet partner, David Frizzell, when they were voted number six on its 100 Greatest Duets Special. Although they did not perform any songs, Shelly West and David Frizzell appeared on the special, for which West was interviewed. West appeared on numerous episodes of Country Family Reunion on RFD-TV.

West has returned to performing occasionally since 2012. She reunited with David Frizzell for two shows on October 13, 2012, at the God and Country Theater in Branson, Missouri. The duo played another show on November 2, 2013, at the Americana Theater in Branson.

Discography

Studio albums

Compilations

Singles

Singles with David Frizzell

Awards

See also
 Dottie West (1932–1991; West's mother)
 David Frizzell (West's duet partner)

References

External links
 
 CMT.com: Shelly West

1958 births
Living people
American country singer-songwriters
American women country singers
Musicians from Cleveland
Singer-songwriters from Ohio
Country musicians from Ohio
21st-century American women